Marks & Clerk is an international group of intellectual property service providers, encompassing patent attorneys, trade mark attorneys, lawyers and consultants. Including partners, it currently employs over 300 legal practitioners worldwide and over 550 other staff. It primarily offers intellectual property (IP) protection, strategy, dispute resolution and commercial and valuation services to clients around the world.

Offices 
The business has a total of 15 offices worldwide. It operates out of eight offices in the UK, two in Canada and others in Luxembourg, China, Hong Kong, Singapore and Malaysia.
 UK – 1887
 Canada – 1921
 Hong Kong – 1973
 Luxembourg – 1989
 Singapore – 1995
 China – 1997
 Anthony Evans & Co. (Hong Kong) – 2008
 Malaysia – 2009

The firm merged with the Lloyd Wise Group in 2007, extending its client base into the Asia-Pacific region. In 2009 its UK Patent and Trade Mark Attorney business became a Limited liability partnership. It celebrated its 130th anniversary in 2017.

References

External links 
Official Site
Managing IP Surveys
Legal 500 Directory
Chambers Legal Directory
Chambers and Partners Firm Profile
IAM 250 World Leading IP Strategists

Law firms established in 1887
Law firms of the United Kingdom
Patent law firms
Intellectual property law firms
Companies based in the City of Westminster